Gehlsbach is a municipality in the Ludwigslust-Parchim district of Mecklenburg-Vorpommern, Germany. It was formed on 1 January 2014 by the merger of the former municipalities of Karbow-Vietlübbe and Wahlstorf.

References

Ludwigslust-Parchim